East Masonville Creek is a river in Delaware County, New York. It flows into Masonville Creek in Masonville.

References

Rivers of New York (state)
Rivers of Delaware County, New York